The Miracle of the Holy Fire may refer to:

Holy Fire, an annual religious ceremony of the Greek Orthodox church in Jerusalem
The Miracle of the Holy Fire (painting), an 1892–99 painting by William Holman Hunt depicting the ceremony